Shane Cloete (born May 21, 1971) is an ex-Zimbabwean cricketer. He was a right-handed batsman and wicket-keeper. He was born in Salisbury (now Harare).

External links
Shane Cloete at CricketArchive 

1971 births
Afrikaner people
Living people
Mashonaland cricketers
Cricketers from Harare
White Zimbabwean people
Zimbabwean cricketers